Namme is a 2017 Georgian art fantasy drama film directed by Zaza Khalvashi. It had an international premiere in the Tokyo International Film Festival. The film's cast  includes theatre actors from Khulo, and director Khalvashi’s screenplay is based on national legends and stories. Namme is an international co-production between Georgia and Lithuania. It was selected as the Georgian entry for the Best Foreign Language Film at the 91st Academy Awards, but it was not nominated.

Plot
Plot of Namme is not based on the traditional structure of narration,  Zaza Khalvashi shows us mystic experience of slow cinema. There are no protagonists or antagonists, as the director said he wanted to express the atmosphere of the surrounding where he lives.

On the opening scene we see the rock where the river flows, the shot is long and beautiful as the whole film. Namme is Ali’s daughter with three mature brothers whose ideology of life is completely different, also Namme and her father live entirely exceptional from the other members of the family. One brother of Namme is Muslim guy, the other one is kind of atheist phenomenon and a teacher in single-pupil class, another guy is Christian Orthodox priest who participates in building of church, on the other hand Ali and Namme perform some pagan rituals and heal people with the water which is sacralized by the mystic fish that was inherited to the family by their ancestors, somehow family should hold the role of fishminder and Namme is obliged to follow her father’s path because her brothers totally refused “father’s icon.”

During this silent-rhythmic and visual acoustic environment director tactically leaves this magical space and shows us urban surroundings and life, also building of weir is infiltrated in this quiet narrative. Because of some technical development for instance the building of weir evokes water pollution and fish becomes sick. Also there is an issue with the puritanity that the Namme isn’t allowed to be in love affairs or this kind of relationships because her and water’s power becomes useless. However she falls in love, power fades away step by step and Namme slowly becomes unable to cure people. She faces the dilemma: private life or sacralized traditions of family that can help people, finally she emancipates from the background and lets the fish go. In one of the latest shot she walks on water and  fades away with the fog and maybe becomes the part of the universe, maybe she continues her private and non-mystic life, that’s on the decision of the audience.

Cast
 Mariska Diasamidze as (Namme)
 Aleko Abashidze
 Ednar Bolkvadze as (Giorgi) the priest
 Roman Bolkvadze as (Nuri) the mullah
 Roin Surmanidze as (Lado) the teacher

Production 
"Namme" a winner of the National Film Center and is work of Georgian-Lithuanian companies. Zaza Khalvashi started to work on scenery many years before the film's premiere. "I wrote the script in 2010, since I was in search of financing, and that's my turn on the screen. In 2016, I got the funding of the National Film Center and I worked, "recalls Director in interview.

He selected mainly non-professional and debutant actors for the film. Zaza chose for leading role Mariska Diasamidze, which is also young filmmaker and has studied animation in Shota Rustaveli Theatre and Film University.

See also
 List of submissions to the 91st Academy Awards for Best Foreign Language Film
 List of Georgian submissions for the Academy Award for Best Foreign Language Film

References

External links
 

2017 films
2010s fantasy drama films
Drama films from Georgia (country)
2010s Georgian-language films
2017 drama films